The Solar Maximum Mission satellite (or SolarMax) was designed to investigate Solar phenomena, particularly solar flares. It was launched on February 14, 1980. The SMM was the first satellite based on the Multimission Modular Spacecraft bus manufactured by Fairchild Industries, a platform which was later used for Landsats 4 and 5 as well as the Upper Atmosphere Research Satellite.

After an attitude control failure in Nov 1980 it was put in standby mode until April 1984 when it was repaired by a Shuttle mission.

The Solar Maximum Mission ended on December 2, 1989, when the spacecraft re-entered the atmosphere and burned up over the Indian Ocean.

Instruments

Failure and repair
The white-light coronagraph/polarimeter (C/P) took coronal images for about six months from March 1980 before suffering an electronics failure in September that prevented operation.

In November 1980, the second of four fuses in SMM's attitude control system failed, causing it to rely on its magnetorquers in order to maintain attitude. In this mode, only three of the seven instruments on board were usable, as the others required the satellite to be accurately pointed at the Sun. The use of the satellite's magnetorquers prevented the satellite from being used in a stable position and caused it to "wobble" around its nominally sun-pointed attitude. SMM was left in standby mode for 3 years.

The first orbiting, unmanned satellite to be repaired in space, SMM was notable in that its useful life compared with similar spacecraft was significantly increased by the direct intervention of a manned space mission. During STS-41-C in April 1984, the Space Shuttle Challenger rendezvoused with the SMM, astronauts James van Hoften and George Nelson attempted to use the Manned Maneuvering Unit to capture the satellite and to bring it into the orbiter's payload bay for repairs and servicing. The plan was to use an astronaut-piloted Maneuvering Unit to grapple the satellite with the Trunnion Pin Attachment Device (TPAD) mounted between the hand controllers of the Maneuvering Unit, null its rotation rates, and allow the Shuttle to bring it into the Shuttle's payload bay for stowage. Three attempts to grapple the satellite using the TPAD failed. The TPAD jaws could not lock onto Solar Max because of an obstructing grommet on the satellite not included in its blueprints.

This led to an improvised plan which nearly ended the satellite's mission. The improvisation had the astronaut use his hands to grab hold of a solar array and null the rotation by a push from the Maneuvering Unit's thrusters. Instead, this attempt induced higher rates and in multiple axes; the satellite was tumbling out of control and quickly losing battery life. SMM Operations Control Center engineers shut down all non-essential satellite subsystems and with a bit of luck were able to recover the satellite minutes before total failure. The ground support engineers then stabilized the satellite and nulled its rotation rates for capture with the Shuttle's robotic arm. This proved to be a much better plan. The satellite had been fitted with one of the arm's grapple fixtures so that the robotic arm was able to capture and maneuver it into the shuttle's payload bay for repairs.

During the mission, the SMM's entire attitude control system module and the electronics module for the coronagraph/polarimeter instrument were replaced, and a gas cover was installed over the X-ray polychromator. Their successful work added five more years to the lifespan of the satellite. The mission was depicted in the 1985 IMAX movie The Dream Is Alive.

Discovery of comets
10 comets were discovered in images from the SMM .

Findings

Significantly, the SMM's ACRIM instrument package showed that contrary to expectations, the Sun is actually brighter during the sunspot cycle maximum (when the greatest number of dark 'sunspots' appear). This is because sunspots are surrounded by bright features called faculae, which more than cancel the darkening effect of the sunspot.

The major scientific findings from the SMM are presented in several review articles in a monograph.

End of mission
SMM's orbit slowly decayed due to atmospheric drag taking it down into denser regions.

The March 1989 geomagnetic storm was reported to have led to SMM dropping half a kilometre at the start of the storm and 3 miles over the whole period.

SMM lost attitude control on November 17, 1989, and re-entry and burn-up  occurred on 2 December 1989 over the Indian Ocean.

See also 

 Advanced Composition Explorer
 Charles Hyder
 Parker Solar Probe
 Solar and Heliospheric Observatory
 WIND (spacecraft)

References

External links

 HEASARC, SMM
 Marshall Space Flight Center, SMM
 SMM C/P Coronal Mass Ejections
 Total Solar Irradiance ACRIM

Spacecraft launched in 1980
Satellites formerly orbiting Earth
Solar telescopes
Spacecraft launched by Delta rockets
Spacecraft which reentered in 1989
Solar space observatories
NASA satellites orbiting Earth